Sands of Sacrifice may refer to:

Sands of Sacrifice (1917 film), an American film directed by Edward Sloman
Tangled Trails, also known as Sands of Sacrifice, a 1921 American film directed by Charles Bartlett